A list of films produced in Argentina in 2008:

See also
2008 in Argentina

External links
 Argentine films of 2008 at the Internet Movie Database

2008
Argentine
Films